Erie Cemetery is a historic rural cemetery located in Erie, Pennsylvania.

History 

The cemetery was conceived in October 1846 when a citizens group circulated a petition and collected $1,500 towards the purchase of land. A new subscription effort in December 1849 led to the incorporation of the cemetery on 29 January 1850, at which time seven managers were named. The deed was conveyed to the corporation on 28 March 1850, at which time a $1,500 deposit was paid and a judgment bond of $6,000 signed to secure payment of the balance due. Officers of the corporation were elected on 24 May 1850, namely George A. Eliot, President; William A. Brown, Secretary; and J. C. Spencer, Treasurer. H. Daniels was hired in December 1850 to develop the property. The formal opening of the cemetery took place on 20 May 1851. A porters' lodge was erected near the main entrance before 1885.

The Erie Cemetery Association manages the Erie Cemetery, as well as Laurel Hill Cemetery in Millcreek Township and Wintergreen Gorge Cemetery in Harborcreek Township.

Notable interments 
Notable people buried at the Erie Cemetery:

References

External links
 Erie Cemetery Association
 
 Native Tree Society

1850 establishments in Pennsylvania
Cemeteries established in the 1850s
Cemeteries in Pennsylvania
Buildings and structures in Erie, Pennsylvania
Rural cemeteries
Tourist attractions in Erie, Pennsylvania